Kikis Kazamias (born 27 August 1951) is a Cypriot economist and politician. He studied International Trade and International Economic Relations at the Berlin School of Economics and Law (BSEL) with a specialization in foreign trade and international economic relations. Returning to Cyprus in 1977, Kazamias became actively involved in politics joining the left-wing Progressive Party of Working People (AKEL).

On 5 August 2011, Kazamias was appointed Finance Minister of Cyprus by Demetris Christofias replacing Charilaos Stavrakis while still serving his term. He was in charge for implementing and negotiating the EU austerity measures within the Cyprus government sector after the 2008 European sovereign debt crisis. He resigned citing medical reasons in March 2012. President Christofias appointed Vassos Shiarly to take his place.

Personal life
Kazamias is married to Rodoula Koliandri. They have three children.

References

Source

1951 births
Living people
Cyprus Ministers of Finance
Members of the House of Representatives (Cyprus)
Greek Cypriot people
People from Famagusta
Progressive Party of Working People politicians
Cyprus Ministers of Communications and Works
21st-century Cypriot politicians